Pál Sümegi (born 11 May 1960 in Tapolca) is a Hungarian geoarchaeologist at the University of Szeged.

Work 

 The geohistory of Bátorliget Marshland : an example for the reconstruction of late Quaternary environmental changes and past human impact from Northeastern part of the Carpatgian Basin. Ed. with Sándor Gulyás. Budapest : Archaeolingua Alapítvány, 2004. 356 p. : ill. (Ser. Archaeolingua; ISSN 1215-9239; 16.) 
 Loess and Upper Paleolithic environment in Hungary : an introduction to the environmental history of Hungary. Nagykovácsi : Aurea, 2005. 312 p. ill. ; 
 Environmental archaeology in north-eastern Hungary. With Erika Gál and Imola Juhász. Budapest : Archaeological Institute of the Hungarian Academy of Sciences, 2005. 426 p. : ill. (Ser. Varia archaeologica Hungarica, ISSN 0237-9090 ; 19.) 
 Environmental archaeology in Transdanubia. With Csilla Zatykó and Imola Juhász. Budapest : Archaeological Institute of the Hungarian Academy of Sciences, 2007. 390 p. ill. (Ser. Varia archaeologica Hungarica; ISSN 0237-9090 ; 20.)

References 
 A Szegedi Tudományegyetem évkönyve : 2000-2003. Szeged : Dr. Szabó Gábor rektor, 2005. Földtani és Őslénytani Tanszék see 170. p. HU ISSN 0133-4468

External links
Monographic component part
Web site (in Hungarian) at the University of Szeged

1960 births
Living people
People from Tapolca
Hungarian archaeologists
Academic staff of the University of Szeged
20th-century archaeologists
21st-century archaeologists